Iowa Colony High School is a senior high school in Iowa Colony, Texas. It is a part of the Alvin Independent School District (AISD) and is within the Alvin ISD Heritage Complex.

The school colors are black, hunter green, and silver. The mascot is the pioneer. It is adjacent to the 10,000-seat Alvin ISD facility Freedom Field.

The school serves almost all of Iowa Colony, and southern Manvel (portions of both places below Texas State Highway 6). Its boundary includes Meridiana.

History
In 2018, Alvin ISD announced it would build another high school in Iowa Colony.

It was scheduled to open on August 17, 2022, with grades 9 and 10 at first; it will expand one more grade level per year until fall 2024. The expected initial enrollment is 800. Ashley Marquez is the initial principal. It will relieve Manvel High School.

There was a previous Iowa Colony High School, located on Brazoria County Road 48 (then Chocolate Bayou Road), in 1912. It closed around the time Iowa Colony's school district became a part of Alvin ISD.

Campus
The designed capacity is 2,500 students.

References

External links
 

Public high schools in Texas
High schools in Brazoria County, Texas
2022 establishments in Texas
Educational institutions established in 2022